Reinier Honig (born 28 October 1983) is a Dutch professional racing cyclist, who currently rides for UCI Continental team .

Major results

2000
 1st  Road race, National Junior Road Championships
2001
 1st  Road race, National Junior Road Championships
2003
 1st Stage 3 Tour de Gironde
2005
 2nd Road race, National Under-23 Road Championships
2006
 8th Grand Prix Pino Cerami
 8th Ronde van Overijssel
2007
 1st Dorpenomloop Rucphen
 2nd Overall Vuelta a Extremadura
 2nd Ronde van Midden-Nederland
2008
 1st Circuito de Getxo
 4th Druivenkoers Overijse
 7th Kampioenschap van Vlaanderen
 9th Rund um die Nürnberger Altstadt
 9th Antwerpse Havenpijl
2009
 5th Gran Piemonte
 6th GP du Canton d'Argovie
 9th Overall Tour of Britain
2011
 3rd Road race, National Road Championships
 10th Tour de Vendée
2012
 5th Beverbeek Classic
 9th Druivenkoers Overijse
2013
 3rd World Ports Classic
2014
 3rd Race Horizon Park 1
 7th Race Horizon Park 3
2019
 4th Overall Vuelta Ciclista a Costa Rica
1st Stage 2

References

External links
 

1983 births
Living people
Dutch male cyclists
People from Heemskerk
Cyclists from North Holland